Zaboršt is a settlement southeast of Bučka in the Municipality of Škocjan in southeastern Slovenia. Within the municipality, it belongs to the Local Community of Bučka.  The municipality is historically part of Lower Carniola and is now included in the Southeast Slovenia Statistical Region.

References

External links
Zaboršt at Geopedia

Populated places in the Municipality of Škocjan